"Take Ü There" is the debut collaboration single by American EDM DJ duo Skrillex and Diplo together as Jack Ü, written and performed by the duo and Canadian singer Kiesza, and produced by the duo. It serves as the lead single from Jack Ü's debut studio album Skrillex and Diplo Present Jack Ü, and was released on October 4, 2014, through Skrillex's Owsla and Diplo's Mad Decent. It peaked at number 63 on the UK Singles Chart.

Background
The song premiered at Diplo's Mad Decent Block Party on August 9, 2014.

Music video
A music video for the song, directed by Joseph Kahn, Dillon Moore and Daniel Streit, was released in November 2014. The video combines real footage with animation.

Critical reception
Issy Sampson of The Guardian chose the song as the best track of the week, writing that, "its playlist-friendly trap sound is mildly panic-inducing, like taking speed and then being told you have to go on live TV and explain the intricacies of Middle Eastern politics RIGHT NOW and is it OK if you do it in just your pants?".

Remix
On February 3, 2015, the pair announced that they would be working with Missy Elliott on a remix to "Take Ü There".

Track listing

Charts

Weekly charts

Year-end charts

References

2014 songs
2014 debut singles
Jack Ü songs
Kiesza songs
Song recordings produced by Skrillex
Song recordings produced by Diplo
Songs written by Skrillex
Songs written by Diplo
Songs written by Kiesza
Songs written by Cirkut (record producer)
Songs written by Dr. Luke
Atlantic Records singles
Owsla singles